The Pinuti is a Filipino  sword from the Visayas, Philippines. The weapon was originally intended as an agricultural implement. The grip is usually made of guava wood, which is light. The blade itself is approximately 16 to 18 inches (40 to 45 cm) long.

Pinuti is Cebuano for "whitened". As a farm implement, it would take on a dark patina due to contact with plant and animal fluids. When farmers sharpened their blades for combat, the blade was polished clean and white.

See also 
Filipino martial arts
Bolo
Kampilan
Kalis
Panabas

Blade weapons
Filipino swords
Weapons of the Philippine Army